Calvary Cemetery is the oldest existing Catholic cemetery in Milwaukee, Wisconsin. Owned by the Archdiocese of Milwaukee, it is the final resting place for many of the city's early influential figures. The cemetery was designated a Milwaukee Landmark in 1981.

With  and approximately 80,000 interments, the Victorian landscape contains many ornate statues, crypts and monuments.

History 

It was filled with the remains of the  "Old Cemetery," which also contained the remains from Milwaukee's first cemetery established in the First Ward. By 1880 Calvary had 10,307 recorded burials and an additional  were added.

Both the Gothic Revival gate house and Romanesque Revival chapel were designed by architect Erhard Brielmaier, who also designed the Basilica of St. Josaphat. A service building was constructed sometime after 1890 in Queen Anne style using Cream City brick, a distinct light colored brick made locally. The building is still in use today.

The wooden gate house with its triumphal arch and four-story tower was completed in 1897. It is the oldest building on the grounds and was repainted in 2002 when a new storage building was built to the west.

Chapel Hill (originally Jesuit Hill) is one of the highest points in Milwaukee. It is used as a burial site for clergy and members of the various religious orders. Many of the city's early catholic churches such as the Cathedral of St. John the Evangelist, Old St. Mary's and St. Gall's (now Gesu Church) also utilize cemetery grounds. A large Calvary cross stood at the peak until it was replaced with the chapel.

The chapel was built in 1899 using Cream City brick and decorated with stone trim. An arched portico with limestone columns and a rose window set the entrance while three hemispherical apses flank the other three sides. It is crowned by an octagonal tower with a peaked roof and clerestory windows. Dedicated on All Souls Day in 1902, the chapel held mass on Memorial Day and All Souls Day until 1950, when the building's deteriorating condition made this impractical.

Archbishop Henni donated  of land across Bluemound Road to the Order of Friars Minor Capuchin on September 9, 1879 for a monastery and church. In exchange, they were to perform funeral services at the cemetery when parish priests were unable to attend. The cornerstone for Holy Cross Church (now St. Vincent Pallotti East) was placed on October 26, 1879 and dedicated on April 20, 1880. The order blessed the cemetery on All Saints Day.

On May 18, 2006 a construction worker unearthed human remains in the area believed to be the location of the Old Cemetery near 22nd and Michigan streets. Thirteen burials have since been identified, and archaeologists are unsure if they are remnants from the cemetery or an earlier burial site used by a Potawatomi village.

Notable interments 
Calvary Cemetery contains a monument dedicated to the approximately 430 people who died with the sinking of the Lady Elgin on Lake Michigan in 1860. Most of those lost in the tragedy were from Milwaukee's Third Ward Irish community and is the second greatest loss of life seen on the Great Lakes.

John Black, 24th mayor of Milwaukee, member of the Wisconsin State Assembly and Senate
Erhard Brielmaier, noted architect who also designed the Basilica of St. Josaphat
William Cary, elected to the U.S. House of Representatives representing Wisconsin's 4th District
Patrick Cudahy, industrialist and founder of the Patrick Cudahy meat packing company
Peter Deuster, elected to the Wisconsin State Assembly, Wisconsin State Senate, and U.S. House of Representatives
Patrick Drew, served in the Wisconsin State Legislature
Adrian Hoecken, Dutch Jezuit missionary among the Native Americans
Robert Johnston, founder of the American Biscuit Company, a precursor to Nabisco
Solomon Juneau, co-founder of the City of Milwaukee and its first mayor
Philipp Jung, early brewer whose business was acquired by Pabst Brewing Company
Matthew Keenan, local politician who helped to establish the Old Soldiers' Home
Edward Keogh, 37th speaker of the Wisconsin State Assembly, represented Milwaukee in the Assembly for 13 terms.
John Luick, founder of the Luick Ice Cream company
Frederick Miller, founder of the Miller Brewing Company
Casper Sanger, businessman and representative in the Wisconsin Legislature 
William H. Timlin, justice of the Wisconsin Supreme Court
George Weissleder, elected to the Wisconsin State Senate and the Wisconsin State Assembly
Joseph Anthony Murphy, Jesuit Priest, Titular Bishop of Birtha, and Dean of College of Arts and Sciences at Marquette University

See also 
List of Milwaukeeans
List of mayors of Milwaukee

Sources 

 Calvary Cemetery
 List of notable people at Calvary (PDF)
 Historic Preservation Commission Study (PDF)

External links
Calvary Cemetery
Calvary Cemetery Burials
Friends of Calvary Cemetery

Cemeteries in Wisconsin
Buildings and structures in Milwaukee
Geography of Milwaukee
Historic American Landscapes Survey in Wisconsin
Roman Catholic Archdiocese of Milwaukee
Roman Catholic cemeteries in Wisconsin
Tourist attractions in Milwaukee
Protected areas of Milwaukee County, Wisconsin
1857 establishments in Wisconsin